Zhanar Zhanzunova (Janar Janzunova; born July 16, 1985 in Kyzylorda) is a Kazakhstani judoka, who played for the middleweight category. She won a silver medal for her division at the 2007 Asian Judo Championships in Kuwait City, Kuwait, and bronze at the 2008 Asian Judo Championships in Jeju City, South Korea.

Zhanzunova represented Kazakhstan at the 2008 Summer Olympics in Beijing, where she competed for the women's middleweight class (70 kg). Unfortunately, she lost the first preliminary match to Colombia's Yuri Alvear, who successfully scored an ippon and a soto makikomi (outer wraparound), at a fastest possible time of twenty-one seconds.

References

External links

NBC 2008 Olympics profile

Kazakhstani female judoka
Living people
Olympic judoka of Kazakhstan
Judoka at the 2008 Summer Olympics
People from Kyzylorda
1985 births
Judoka at the 2006 Asian Games
Judoka at the 2010 Asian Games
Asian Games competitors for Kazakhstan
21st-century Kazakhstani women